Dan Wickline (born April 29, 1970 in Norwalk, California) is a published writer and photographer.

Early life
Dan Wickline was born in Norwalk, California.

Career
He has written for Image Comics, IDW Publishing, Humanoids Publishing, Zenescope Entertainment, Avatar Press, Cellar Door Publishing and Moonstone Books.

His photography was collected in 2005 by Goliath Books/ Mix-of-pics and published under the title Private Skin. His current writing work includes 1001 Arabian Nights: The Adventures of Sinbad and Grimm Fairy Tales for Zenescope, and a prose piece for an upcoming “Avenger” novel for Moonstone.

Personal life
Wickline resides in Los Angeles.

Bibliography
 Creepers (writer/colors/letters, with art by Jeff Crumpler, Hardline Studios, May 1996)
 Bloodlust (2 Issues; writer/colors/letters, with art by BREED, Hardline Studios, August 99 to November 99)
 Force (writer/colors/letters, with art by Brent Evans, Hardline Studios, January 2000)
 Anomaly #3: Lapse (writer/inks/letters, with art by Mikel Whelan, Brass Ring Productions, July 2001)
 "loodlust"(writer, with art by Mikel Whelan, in Digital Webbing Presents #2, Digital Webbing Presents, March 2002)
 "Dragon of the Northern Pass" (writer, with art by Scott Benefiel, in Metal Hurlant magazine #8, Humanoids Publishing, September 2003)
 "Shelter Me" (writer, with art by Mark Vigouroux, in Metal Hurlant #9, Humanoids Publishing, November 2003)
 The Conversation (writer/letters, with art by David Hedgecock, Red Eye Press,  January 2004)
 Razor X: Requiem (Postscript; writer, Avatar Press, May 2004)
 Hero Happy Hour Super Special - Busting Out (writer, with art by Brett Weldele, Geek Punk, July 2004)
 Blood-Stained Sword (writer, with art by Ben Templesmith, 48 page one-shot, IDW Publishing, January 2005)
 "Forbidden Valley" (writer, with art by Bobby Breed, in Western Tales of Terror #3, Hoarse & Buggy Productions, March 2005)
 "Lorne: Vanishing Herd" (writer, with art by Kody Chamberlain, in Event Horizon, Mam Tor Publishing, May 2005)
 "Lorne: The Eagle and the Serpent" (writer, with art by Szymon Kudranski, in Event Horison, Mam Tor Publishing, October 2005)
 30 Days of Night: Dead Space (with co-writer Steve Niles, art by Milx, 3-issue mini-series, IDW Publishing, January - March 2006)
 I Am Spartacus (writer, with art by Illka Lesonen, Cellar Door Publishing, April 2006)
  Monkey in a Wagon VS Lemur on a Big Wheel - In Space No One Can Hear a Squeaky Wheel (writer with art by Mark Dos Santos, Silent Devil Productions, August 2006)
 30 Days of Night: Spreading the Disease (writer with art by Alex Sanchez, 5-issue mini-series, IDW Publishing, December 2006 - April 2007)
 The Unusual Suspects (writer, with art by Nat Jones/Ben Templesmith/Tone Rodriguez/Chris Moreno/Etc., original graphic novel, Top Cow Productions, March 2007)
 Steve Niles' Strange Cases (writer, with art by David Hartman, 4-issue mini-series, Image Comics, August 2007 - June 2008)
 The Phantom Chronicles - Reflection of the Ghost (writer, Moonstone Books, October 2007)
 1001 Arabian Nights: The Adventures of Sinbad (writer, with art by Gus Vasquez, Paolo Pantalena, Tone Rodriguez, Etc., Zenescope Entertainment, March 2008 - ongoing)
 The Avenger Chronicles - The Girl Who Saw Death (writer, Moonstone Books, July 2008)
 Savage (writer, with art by Mike Mayhew, Image/Shadowline, October 2008 - January 2009)
 Grimm Fairy Tales #27: Three Blind Mice (writer, with art by Dean Juliette, Zenescope Entertainment, May 2008)
 Grimm Fairy Tales #33: Three Snake Leaves (writer, with art by Jordan Gunderson, Zenescope Entertainment, December 2008)
 Grimm Fairy Tales #34: Puss In Boots (writer, with art by Unknown, Zenescope Entertainment, January 2008)
 Grimm Fairy Tales #35: Dorian Gray (writer, with art by Unknown, Zenescope Entertainment, February 2008)

References

External links
 

 Dan's Photography Website (Mature Content)

Youtube links
 Steve Niles, Dan Wickline & David Hartman Outtakes From Strange Cases Interview
 I Am Spartacus Comic Trailer
 Strange Cases #1 Digital Comic

American graphic novelists
American photographers
Writers from Los Angeles

1970 births
Living people
People from Norwalk, California
American male novelists
Novelists from California